Yu Mei-nu (born 28 January 1955) is a Taiwanese politician. A member of the Democratic Progressive Party, she served in the Legislative Yuan from 2012 to 2020.

Education and early career 
Yu obtained her bachelor's and master's degree in law from National Taiwan University. She pursued doctoral legal studies at the University of Frankfurt. Yu subsequently worked as a lawyer.

Political career
Yu is a staunch supporter for the legalization of same-sex marriage in Taiwan, and known for her advocacy of women's rights.

Personal life
Yu is married to Remington Huang.

Honors and recognition
In 2020 she was conferred the Ordre national du Mérite on behalf of the French President.

References

1955 births
Politicians of the Republic of China on Taiwan from Changhua County
Party List Members of the Legislative Yuan
Members of the 8th Legislative Yuan
Democratic Progressive Party Members of the Legislative Yuan
Members of the 9th Legislative Yuan
National Taiwan University alumni
Taiwanese women lawyers
Living people
21st-century Taiwanese women politicians
Taiwanese human rights activists
Taiwanese LGBT rights activists
Knights of the Ordre national du Mérite